This is a list of 146 species in Lasioptera, a genus of gall midges in the family Cecidomyiidae.

Lasioptera species

 Lasioptera abhamata Felt, 1907 i c g
 Lasioptera achyranthesae Sharma, 1988 c g
 Lasioptera achyranthii Shinji, 1939 c g
 Lasioptera aechynomensis (Brethes, 1918) c g
 Lasioptera aeschynanthusperottetti Mani, 1943 c g
 Lasioptera annandalei (Mani, 1934) c g
 Lasioptera anonae Tavares, 1908 c g
 Lasioptera argentata Loew, 1850 c g
 Lasioptera ariasis Skuhrava & Garcia, 2001 g
 Lasioptera arizonensis Felt, 1908 i c g
 Lasioptera artemisiae Dombrovskaja, 1940 c g
 Lasioptera artemisifoliae Shinji, 1939 c g
 Lasioptera arundinis Schiner, 1854 c g
 Lasioptera astericola Shinji, 1939 c g
 Lasioptera asterspinosae White, 1950 i c g
 Lasioptera asystasiae Nayar, 1944 c g
 Lasioptera aurata Skuse, 1888 c g
 Lasioptera auricincta Loew, 1850 c g
 Lasioptera azamii Shinji, 1939 c g
 Lasioptera basiflava Felt, 1908 i c g
 Lasioptera berberina (Schrank, 1781) c g
 Lasioptera berlesiana Paoli, 1907 c g
 Lasioptera bothriochloae Rao & Sharma, 1977 c g
 Lasioptera bryoniae Schiner, 1868 c g
 Lasioptera buhri Möhn, 1968 c g
 Lasioptera calamagrostidis Rübsaamen, 1893 c g
 Lasioptera callicarpae (Shinji, 1938) c
 Lasioptera camelliae Ohno & Yukawa, 1984 c g
 Lasioptera carophila Loew, 1874 c g
 Lasioptera caryae Felt, 1907 i c g
 Lasioptera centerensis Felt, 1918 i c g
 Lasioptera cephalandrae (Mani, 1934) c g
 Lasioptera cerasiphera Stelter, 1990 c g
 Lasioptera cerei Rübsaamen, 1905 c g
 Lasioptera chichindae (Grover, 1965) c g
 Lasioptera cimicifugae Kovalev, 1967 c g
 Lasioptera cinerea Felt, 1907 i c g
 Lasioptera clinopodii Kovalev, 1967 c g
 Lasioptera collinsonifolia (Beutenmuller, 1908) i c g
 Lasioptera cordobensis Kieffer & Jörgensen, 1910 c g
 Lasioptera corni Felt, 1907 i c g
 Lasioptera corusca Skuse, 1888 c g
 Lasioptera crataevae (Mani, 1934) c
 Lasioptera cratavae (Mani, 1934) c g
 Lasioptera cubitalis Kieffer, 1913 c g
 Lasioptera cylindrigallae Felt, 1907 i c g
 Lasioptera dioscoreae Kovalev, 1967 c g
 Lasioptera dombrovskajae Fedotova & Kovalev, 2005 c g
 Lasioptera donacis Coutin & Faivre-Amiot, 1982 c g
 Lasioptera ephedrae Cockerell, 1898 i c g b
 Lasioptera ephedricola Cockerell, 1902 i c g
 Lasioptera eriochloa Felt, 1926 c g
 Lasioptera eryngii (Vallot, 1829) c g
 Lasioptera euphobiae Shinji, 1944 c g
 Lasioptera excavata Felt, 1907 i c g
 Lasioptera falcata Felt, 1919 c g
 Lasioptera flavoventris (Felt, 1908) i c g
 Lasioptera fluitans Felt, 1917 c g
 Lasioptera foeniculi Dorchin & Freidberg g
 Lasioptera francoisi (Kieffer, 1902) c g
 Lasioptera fructuaria Felt, 1916 i c g
 Lasioptera furcata Philippi, 1865 c g
 Lasioptera gibaushi Shinji, 1939 c g
 Lasioptera graciliforceps Kieffer & Jörgensen, 1910 c g
 Lasioptera hamata (Felt, 1907) i c g
 Lasioptera helvipes Skuse, 1888 c g
 Lasioptera heterothalami Kieffer & Jörgensen, 1910 c g
 Lasioptera hieronymi (Weyenergh, 1875) c g
 Lasioptera howardi Felt, 1921 i c g
 Lasioptera humulicaulis Felt, 1907 i c g
 Lasioptera hungarica Möhn, 1968 c g
 Lasioptera hygrophila Kovalev, 1967 c g
 Lasioptera indica Rao, 1952 c g
 Lasioptera javanica Kieffer & Leeuwen-Reijnvaan, 1910 c g
 Lasioptera kallstroemia Felt, 1935 i c g
 Lasioptera kasarzewskella Marikovskij, 1958 c g
 Lasioptera koreana Kovalev, 1967 c g
 Lasioptera kosarzewskella Marikovskij, 1957 c g
 Lasioptera lactucae Felt, 1907 i c g
 Lasioptera lespedezae Shinji, 1939 c g
 Lasioptera lignicola Schiner, 1868 c g
 Lasioptera longipes Kieffer, 1904 c g
 Lasioptera longispatha Kieffer, 1909 c g
 Lasioptera lonicericola Kovalev, 1967 c g
 Lasioptera loyolai Mani, 1986 c g
 Lasioptera mangiflorae (Grover, 1968) c g
 Lasioptera manilensis Felt, 1918 c g
 Lasioptera mastersi Skuse, 1888 c g
 Lasioptera melampyri Möhn, 1968 c g
 Lasioptera miscella Skuse, 1888 c g
 Lasioptera moliniae Möhn, 1968 c g
 Lasioptera monticola Kieffer & Herbst, 1909 c g
 Lasioptera nenuae (Grover, 1965) c g
 Lasioptera nigrocincta Kieffer, 1904 c g
 Lasioptera nodosae Skuse, 1888 c g
 Lasioptera obfuscata (Meigen, 1818) c g
 Lasioptera orientalis Rao, 1956 c g
 Lasioptera paederiae (Shinji, 1944) c g
 Lasioptera pallipes Philippi, 1865 c g
 Lasioptera paniculi Felt, 1920 c g
 Lasioptera parva (Walker, 1848) c g
 Lasioptera piriqueta Felt, 1917 c g
 Lasioptera populnea Wachtl, 1883 c g
 Lasioptera portulacae Cook, 1911 c g
 Lasioptera psederae Felt, 1934 c g
 Lasioptera puerariae (Shinji, 1938) c g
 Lasioptera pusilla (Meigen, 1818) c g
 Lasioptera querciflorae Felt, 1908 i c g
 Lasioptera querciperda Felt, 1908 i c g
 Lasioptera quercirami Felt, 1926 i c g
 Lasioptera rubi (Schrank, 1803) c g
 Lasioptera ruebsaameni Möhn, 1968 c g
 Lasioptera rufa Kieffer, 1904 c g
 Lasioptera serotina Felt, 1908 i c g
 Lasioptera solani (Felt, 1907) i c g
 Lasioptera solidaginis Osten Sacken, 1863 i c g b
 Lasioptera soongarica Fedotova, 1991 c g
 Lasioptera sorghivora (Harris, 1960) c g
 Lasioptera spiraeafolia Felt, 1909 i c g
 Lasioptera stelteri Möhn, 1968 c g
 Lasioptera tarbagataica Fedotova, 1991 c g
 Lasioptera taroiae (Grover, 1965) c g
 Lasioptera terminaliae Tavares, 1908 c g
 Lasioptera textor Kieffer, 1905 c g
 Lasioptera thuringica Möhn, 1968 c g
 Lasioptera tibialis Felt, 1914 i c g
 Lasioptera tiliarum Mamaeva, 1964 c g
 Lasioptera tomentosae (Grover, 1967) c g
 Lasioptera toombii (Grover, 1962) c g
 Lasioptera tridentifera Kieffer & Jörgensen, 1910 c g
 Lasioptera trilobata Kieffer, 1909 c g
 Lasioptera tuberosa Kieffer, 1913 c g
 Lasioptera turcica Möhn, 1968 c g
 Lasioptera ukogi Shinji, 1940 c g
 Lasioptera umbelliferarum Kieffer, 1909 c g
 Lasioptera uncinata Gagne, 1997 c g
 Lasioptera urvilleae Tavares, 1909 c g
 Lasioptera ussurica Mamaeva & Kritskaya, 1980 c g
 Lasioptera vastatrix Skuse, 1888 c g
 Lasioptera ventralis Say, 1824 i c g
 Lasioptera viburni Felt, 1907 i c g
 Lasioptera virgata Skuse, 1890 c g
 Lasioptera vitis Osten Sacken, 1862 i c g b
 Lasioptera wildi Skuse, 1890 c g
 Lasioptera yadokariae Yukawa & Haitsuka, 1994 c g
 Lasioptera ziziae Felt, 1908 i c g

Data sources: i = ITIS, c = Catalogue of Life, g = GBIF, b = Bugguide.net

References

Lasioptera
Articles created by Qbugbot